Emese Kovács (born March 1, 1991) is a Hungarian swimmer from Baja.

References

1991 births
Living people
Hungarian female swimmers
Hungarian female butterfly swimmers
Swimmers at the 2008 Summer Olympics
Olympic swimmers of Hungary
European Aquatics Championships medalists in swimming
People from Baja, Hungary
Sportspeople from Bács-Kiskun County
20th-century Hungarian women
21st-century Hungarian women